Andy Masaryk (born 7 April 2005) is a Slovak footballer who plays for Železiarne Podbrezová as a left-winger.

Club career

FK Železiarne Podbrezová
Masaryk made his professional debut for Železiarne Podbrezová against MFK Dukla Banská Bystrica on 19 August 2022.

References

External links
 FK Železiarne Podbrezová official club profile 
 
 Futbalnet profile 
 

2005 births
Living people
Slovak footballers
Slovakia youth international footballers
Association football midfielders
FK Železiarne Podbrezová players
Slovak Super Liga players
2. Liga (Slovakia) players